Holy Family with the Infant Saint John the Baptist may refer to several paintings:

 Holy Family with the Infant Saint John the Baptist (Beccafumi, Alte Pinakothek)
 Holy Family with the Infant Saint John the Baptist (Beccafumi, Galleria Palatina)
 Holy Family with the Infant Saint John the Baptist (Beccafumi, Uffizi)
 Holy Family with the Infant Saint John the Baptist (Correggio, Los Angeles)
 Holy Family with the Infant Saint John the Baptist (Correggio, Orléans)
 Holy Family with the Infant Saint John the Baptist (Mantegna)
 Holy Family with the Infant Saint John the Baptist (Murillo)
 Holy Family with the Infant Saint John the Baptist (Pontormo)
 Holy Family with the Infant Saint John the Baptist (Parmigianino)
 Holy Family with the Infant Saint John the Baptist (Rosso Fiorentino)

See also
 Holy Family with the Infant John the Baptist and a Donor, by Beccafumi
 Holy Family with the Family of St John the Baptist, by Lorenzo Lotto